Amundsen Icefall is a steep and turbulent icefall where the Axel Heiberg Glacier descends from the polar plateau between Mount Fridtjof Nansen and Mount Don Pedro Christophersen, in the Queen Maud Mountains of Antarctica. Named by the Southern Party of the New Zealand Geological Survey Antarctic Expedition (1961–62) for Captain Roald Amundsen, who ascended Axel Heiberg Glacier en route to the South Pole in 1911.

References
 

Queen Maud Mountains
Icefalls of the Ross Dependency
Amundsen Coast